Vengalayapalem is a village in Guntur district of the Indian state of Andhra Pradesh. It is located in Guntur mandal of Guntur revenue division.

References

Villages in Guntur district